An intermediary (also known as a middleman or go-between) is a third party that offers intermediation services between two parties,  which involves conveying messages between principals in a dispute, preventing direct contact and potential escalation of the issue. In law, intermediaries can facilitate communication between a vulnerable witness, defendant and court personnel to acquire valuable evidence, whilst in barter, the intermediary is a person or group who stores valuables in trade until they are needed, parties to the barter or others have space available to take delivery of them and store them, or until other conditions are met.

In diplomacy and international relations, an intermediary may convey messages between principals in a dispute, allowing the avoidance of direct principal-to-principal contact. Where the two parties are geographically distant, the process may be termed shuttle diplomacy. Where parties do not want formal diplomatic relations, an intermediary state may serve as a protecting power facilitating diplomacy without diplomatic recognition.

Law
In law, intermediaries can facilitate communication between a vulnerable witness, defendant and court personnel to acquire valuable evidence and to ensure all parties have a fair trial.

Trading
An intermediary acts as a conduit for goods or services offered by a supplier to a consumer. Typically the intermediary offers some added value to the transaction that may not be possible by direct trading.

Common usage includes the insurance and financial services industries where e.g. mortgage brokers, insurance brokers, and financial advisers offer intermediation services in the supply of financial products such as mortgage loans, insurance, and investment products. In relation to energy supplies, third party intermediaries provide energy-related advice, assistance in purchasing energy and management of energy needs.

In barter, the intermediary will store valuables in trade until they are needed, parties to the barter or others can take delivery of them and store them, or until other conditions are met. In a larger sense, an intermediary can be a person or organization who or which facilitates a contract between two other parties. The internet is creating opportunities to automate the role of an intermediary in many industries.

Trading Intermediaries can be classified as merchant intermediaries or as accountant intermediaries. Bailey and Bakos (1997) analyzed a number of case studies and identified four roles of electronic intermediaries including information aggregating, providing trust, facilitating and matching.

See also
 Disintermediation
 Innovation intermediary
 Internet intermediary
 Non-Registered Intermediary
 Registered Intermediary
 Retail

References 

Supply chain management